Storm the Gates of Hell is the fourth studio album by Christian metal band Demon Hunter, released on November 6, 2007. It is the band's last album to feature Don Clark and Ethan Luck.

Touring and promotion
Demon Hunter embarked on the Stronger Than Hell Tour in promotion of the album. The summer tour began in May 2008 and included Living Sacrifice, Oh, Sleeper, The Famine, and Advent.

The album's lead single, "Fading Away," along with the title track and "Carry Me Down," can be heard on the band's official MySpace.  A promotional site entitled "A Thread of Light" was made, where one can listen to samples of "Storm the Gates of Hell," "I Am You," and "Fiction Kingdom." Two weeks before its release, the album leaked into P2P networks in its entirety. On November 2, the whole album was put on the Demon Hunter's Myspace page for previewing. Storm the Gates of Hell started at #85 on the Billboard 200, selling nearly 10,500 copies in the first week.

A music video was produced for "Fading Away." It was directed by Zach Merck, known for his previous work with Shadows Fall. The video has found considerable airplay on MTV2's Headbangers Ball. The music video for "Carry Me Down" also aired on MTV2.

Critical reception
The album was met with generally positive views.  Ben Hurrell CrossRhythms gave the album nine out of ten stars saying "Since their appearance on a record label compilation in 2002 the band have hit the big time, releasing four albums gaining widespread coverage in the mainstream media as well as Christian circles."  About.com gave the album three and a half out of five stars stating, "It's a step forward from their last release. They have really stepped up their songwriting. The tracks are a diverse mix of metallic riffs and warm melodies."  Allmusic did not give the album a score, but still praised the album saying, "Demon Hunter sparingly employs more traditional vocals and moody textures throughout the roaring, rapid firestorm of the songs.  Even if rock is the 'devil's music,' Demon Hunter aren't afraid to use it to get their point across."

Track listing

Credits
Demon Hunter
Ryan Clark — lead vocals
Don Clark — rhythm guitar
Ethan Luck — lead guitar, lap steel guitar
Jon Dunn — bass guitar
Timothy "Yogi" Watts — drums

Production and additional musicians
Bruce Fitzhugh — guest vocals on track 3
Aaron Sprinkle — keyboards, producer, programming
Shaun Lopez — rhythm guitar, theremin, production
Chris Carmichael — strings
Art direction by Invisible Creature
Mixed by Machine at The Machine Shop (Hoboken, New Jersey)
Management by Ryan J. Downey

Alternate editions
Three editions of the album were produced: regular, special, and deluxe.

The special edition contains a DVD, two bonus songs ("No Reason To Exist" and "Grand Finale"), and special packaging.
The (limited) deluxe edition contains a DVD with extended footage apart from the Special Edition, two bonus songs ("No Reason To Exist" and "Grand Finale"), exclusive limited packaging including a large format booklet with exclusive studio photos, lyrics, liner notes and more, an exclusive band postcard set, a rare Demon Hunter necklace with a Skull Horn pendant, and a Demon Hunter sticker.

Awards 

In 2009, the Deluxe Edition, along with Trenches's The Tide Will Swallow Us Whole and Hawk Nelson's ...Is My Friend albums which were also designed by Invisible Creature, was nominated for a Dove Award for Recorded Music Packaging of the Year at the 40th GMA Dove Awards.

References

Sources
AThreadofLight.com The promotional site for the album "Storm The Gates Of Hell"
 Opening Week Album Sales

External links

Demon Hunter albums
2007 albums
Solid State Records albums
Albums produced by Aaron Sprinkle